Hell Is Other People is a 2019 South Korean television series starring Im Si-wan and Lee Dong-wook. Based on the Naver WEBTOON webtoon series of the same name by Kim Yong-ki, it is the second series of OCN's "Dramatic Cinema" project which combines film and drama formats. It aired from August 31 to October 6, 2019.

The title is a reference to an often misinterpreted quote by Jean-Paul Sartre from No Exit.

Synopsis
It tells the story of a young man, Yoon Jong Woo (Im Si-wan) in his 20s who moves to Seoul after landing an internship in a company. While looking for a place to stay, he stumbles upon Eden Studio, an ominous cheap dormitory and decides to stay there as he is low on money. Though not thrilled about the quality of the place and its abnormal residents, including his next-door neighbor Seo Moon Jo (Lee Dong-wook), he decides to tolerate it until he saves enough money to move out. However, mysterious occurrences start occurring in the studio, causing Jong Woo to start fearing the studio's residents.

Cast

Main
 Im Si-wan as Yoon Jong-woo, a writer who comes from countryside and moves in room 303 at Eden Dormitory after landed a new job at a new company his older friend created. He takes Eden Dormitory for cheap price, only to find out that the dormitory isn't just an ordinary dormitory.
 Lee Dong-wook as Seo Moon-jo, a dentist who works near Eden Dormitory and lives in room 304. He comes across as a friendly and compassionate dentist; however, things are not what they seem.

Supporting

Yoon Jong-woo's colleagues
  as Shin Jae-ho, Jong-woo's university senior and now boss.
  as Park Byeong-min, Jong-woo's chief at the company.
 Oh Hye-won as Son Yoo-jeong, Jong-woo's only female colleague.
 Park Ji-han as Go Sang-man, the head of section at Jong-woo's company.

People at Eden Dormitory
 Lee Jung-eun as Eom Bok-soon, the owner of Eden Dormitory. She seems friendly but she hides a very dark secret.
 Lee Hyun-wook as Yoo Gi-hyeok, a mysterious and cold resident who lives in room 302. 
 Park Jong-hwan as Byeon Deuk-jong / Byeon Deuk-soo, twin brothers who respectively live in rooms 306 and 307. Deuk-jong is mentally handicapped, while Deuk-soo has better intelligence than his twin brother.
 Lee Joong-ok as Hong Nam-bok, a resident who lives in room 313. He is a porn-addict.
  as Ahn Hee-joong, a thug resident who lives in room 310. He was planning to leave the dormitory and starting a new and better life.

Others
 Ahn Eun-jin as So Jung-hwa, a policewoman with a degree in Engineering.
  as chief of patrol division.
 Kim Ji-eun as Min Ji-eun, an office worker and Jong-woo's girlfriend.
  as Cha Sung-ryeol, a detective who often works with gangsters.
  as Joo Yoo-cheol, a reporter who works for a daily newspaper.
 Ha Seon-haeng as So Jae-heon, a former detective and Jung-hwa's father.
  as So Jung-hwa's grandmother.
 Noh Jong-hyun as Kang Seok-yoon, a new resident at Eden Dormitory.
 Song Yoo-hyun as Han Go-eun, Ji-eun's boss.
Anupam Tripathi as Kumail

Special appearances
 Lim Soo-hyung as Taxi driver
  as a flower seller
  as a murder victim
 Kim Yannie as Kumail's wife
  as a bully

Production
The first script reading took place in April 2019 in Sangam-dong, Seoul, South Korea.

Original soundtrack

Part 1

Part 2

Part 3

Part 4

Viewership

Awards and nominations

Notes

References

External links
  
 
 

OCN television dramas
Korean-language television shows
2019 South Korean television series debuts
2019 South Korean television series endings
South Korean thriller television series
Television shows based on South Korean webtoons
Television series by Studio N (Naver)